The 1950 All-Ireland Senior Football Championship Final was the 63rd All-Ireland Final and the deciding match of the 1950 All-Ireland Senior Football Championship, an inter-county Gaelic football tournament for the top teams in Ireland, between Mayo and Louth.
The referee for the 1950 final was Simon Deignan, who played for Cavan in the 1947 and 1948 finals.

This was the first of two consecutive All-Ireland football titles won by Mayo. They have not won an All-Ireland football title since 1951.

The attendance of 76,174 was the third highest on record in a final at that time.

Match

Mayo won the toss and elected to play against the wind in the first half. Nicky Roe put Louth ahead within the first minute. Mayo responded through Éamonn Mongey and took the lead when a well-placed shot by forward Peter Solan beat the Louth goalkeeper Thornton.

Mayo were forced into making a substitution with Billy Kenny being withdrawn following a collision with Louth midfielder Frank Reid. They increased their lead however with successive points from Mick Mulderrig and Joe Gilvarry. Nicky Roe then goaled for Louth who raised another white flag with a fisted point from wing-forward Jimmy McDonnell.

Mayo then replaced their starting goalkeeper Durkin with Seán Wynne. Nicky Roe kicked a free and scored the last point of the half on 32 minutes, to leave Louth a point in front at the interval.

Second Half

Roe continued where he had left off by pointing a free early on. Louth corner-forward Mickey Reynolds subsequently had an excellent goal chance but shot over the bar with the Mayo keeper Wynne beaten. 

With the wind now more of a factor, Mayo replied with another point from the outstanding Éamonn Mongey. His midfield partner Pádraig Carney spurned two scoreable opportunities before the prolific Nicky Roe restored Louth's two-point lead.

Louth's cause was not helped with Roe having to leave the field due to injury
and with five minutes remaining came the key moment of the match. Mayo snatched a freak goal  after Seán Flanagan charged down a Seán Boyle clearance. Mick Flanagan took up possession and fisted to the Louth net after a twenty-yard run.

Mayo, finishing the stronger of the two sides, added on a further point through Mick Mulderrig to lead by two (2-5 to 1-6) as full-time approached and there would be no response from the Wee County men.

Details

{| width=100% style="font-size: 100%"
|

References

All-Ireland Senior Football Championship Final
All-Ireland Senior Football Championship Final, 1950
All-Ireland Senior Football Championship Finals
All-Ireland Senior Football Championship Finals
Louth county football team matches
Mayo county football team matches